John T. Van Sant (November 2, 1915 – October 3, 1972) was an American politician from Pennsylvania who served as a Republican member of the Pennsylvania State Senate for the 16th district from 1955 to 1970.  He also served in the Pennsylvania House of Representatives for the Lehigh County district from 1951 to 1954.

Van Sant was born in Delano, Pennsylvania and graduated from Hazleton High School.  He attended Westminster College in Fulton, Missouri and Muhlenberg College.  He worked as a radio announcer on WRAK (AM) and as the sports and news director for WSAN radio in Allentown, Pennsylvania.  He served in the U.S. Navy during World War II in Hawaii and Guam.

He died on October 3, 1972 and is interred at Greenwood Cemetery in Allentown, Pennsylvania.

References

1915 births
1972 deaths
20th-century American politicians
United States Navy personnel of World War II
Burials in Pennsylvania
Republican Party members of the Pennsylvania House of Representatives
Military personnel from Pennsylvania
Muhlenberg College alumni
Republican Party Pennsylvania state senators
Westminster College (Missouri) alumni